Chorisops marginata, is a species of soldier fly.

Distribution
Myanmar.

References

Stratiomyidae
Diptera of Asia
Endemic fauna of Myanmar
Taxa named by Richard Karl Hjalmar Frey
Insects described in 1961